Mooball is a national park located in New South Wales, Australia,  northeast of Sydney.

Here is one of the largest lowland rainforests in Australia, and it is also a refuge for several animal species.

See also
 Protected areas of New South Wales

References 

National parks of New South Wales
Protected areas established in 1999
1999 establishments in Australia